Crime Investigation Australia is an Australian true-crime series that first premiered on pay TV Foxtel's Crime & Investigation Network in August 2005. The series was also rebroadcast on Free to air Nine Network, and made its debut there on 14 August 2007. The original host of the series was Steve Liebmann and is currently on Channel 7 with host Matt Doran.

Production
The series was produced by Graham McNeice who resides in Moore Park, New South Wales and is director of Shadow Productions. In a 2008 interview, McNeice said the impetus for the series was to provide an element of local content to a channel (Foxtel) that is dominated by American and European crime stories. Foxtel announced that the series would be "rested" for 2010, however, it never returned.

The series included interviews from victims, families, investigators, lawyers, and journalists.  The crimes were further reviewed using original media and police audio and video footage alongside re-enactments and interviews shot in the same locations where the crimes took place.

Episodes

Series 1
 No More Grannies – The Granny Killer
 Kid for Ransom/Tears for Daniel
 Death in a Heartbeat/The Body in the Bag
 Ivan Milat: The Backpacker Murders
 Contract to Kill/The Mornington Monster
 The Moorhouse Horrors/The Call Girl Killing
 The Killer Punch/The Will of Death
 The Anita Cobby Murder
 Snowtown: Bodies in the Barrels
 The Kimberley Killer
 The Wanda Beach Murders/The Beaumont Children Mystery
 The Greenough Family Massacre
 The Disappearance of Donald Mackay
 The Body in the Sports Bag
 The Assassination of John Newman
 The Butchered Boys

Series 2
 The Killing Fields of Truro
 No Mercy: The Killing of Virginia Morse
 The Night Caller: Eric Edgar Cooke
 Headless Body: The Kim Barry Murder
 The Gonzales Family Murders
 Thrill Kill: The Janine Balding Murder
 Hunt for a Killer: The Claremont Murders
 The Devil Inside – John Ernest Cribb
 The Predator: Leonard John Fraser
 Evil Heart: The Murder of Donna Wheeler/The Disappearance of Trudie Adams

Series 3
 The Girls Who Knew Too Much (Juanita Nielsen and Sallie-Anne Huckstepp)
 Bloodsport – The Bondi Gay Murders
 A Killer Amongst Us – The Norfolk Island Murder
 Night of Terror: The Bega Schoolgirls
 Murder of Innocence – Sian Kingi
 Date with a Serial Killer: Rodney Cameron
 Cop Killer – The Winchester Assassination
 Michael Kanaan: Shoot to Kill
 Buried Alive: Luckman and Reid
 Mystery of the Homestead Murders

Series 4
 Cangai siege
 Kerry Whelan – Wife for ransom
 Body in the suitcase – Karlie Pearce-Stevenson and Khandalyce Pearce
 Unknown Episode Yet To air on Channel 7 or 7 Plus as of 2022
 Almost a perfect murder – Bill & Pamela Weightman
 Murder & Mayhem – George Brown and Fine Cotton
 On Borrowed Time – The Michael McGurk Assassination
 Hero To Hitman – Lindsey Rose

Reception
The show was generally well received. Michelle Nagy in her Editorial Review of the program writes:”Crime Investigation Australia presents an impressive package, using re-enactments, montages of real evidence, locations, maps, photos and real footage – not to mention leading Australian anchor Steve Liebmann, who lends weight and integrity to the series." Similarly: “...McNeice's films skilfully dramatise the stories behind these cases, though in disturbing the past he sometimes creates a sense of dismay... McNeice, with his just-the-facts method, unashamedly gives us criminality, violence, gritty realism, horror and psychopathology. There is no apology and no shame here, which is what makes it such riveting TV."A recent review by David Knox explains that:"...it shies away from emotive, sometimes even racist, sensationalism of other players. CIA has also triggered viewers to come forth with new information – surely a measure of success for any in this genre." Another review states:"Crime Investigation Australia has all the hallmarks of a pay-TV documentary – lots of stock footage, dodgy re-enactments, eerie music and talking heads – but nevertheless tells an engaging tale."The re-enactments featured on the show are often explicit, as for example the Anita Cobby episode in which the moment of the murder is replayed over and over again. There are also inaccuracies and anachronisms, for example in the Beaumont Children Mystery episode where the hairstyles and hair lengths of the child actresses playing Jane and Arnna Beaumont do not match photographs of the real children and Jane is wearing a 2006-era pink "Speedo" female child's swimsuit instead of a period-accurate little girl's swimsuit.

Revival
In 2018, Channel 7 began re-broadcasting some but not all of the original episodes originally hosted by Steve Lirbmann on Foxtel and Channel 9. It was re branded Crime Investigation Australia: Most Infamous. This new series is hosted by Matt Doran. Doran revised the original series with new information and updates on particular cases. In 2022 season 4 released on Channel 7 with new episodes again with Matt Doran as host.

See also
 List of Australian television series
 Crime in Australia

References

External links
 

Nine Network original programming
Australian non-fiction television series
2000s Australian crime television series
2005 Australian television series debuts
2009 Australian television series endings